Baumberg (also Monheim-Baumberg) is part of the city of Monheim am Rhein in the district of Mettmann in North Rhine-Westphalia (Germany) at the southern border of Düsseldorf, placed on the eastern bank of the river Rhine. Baumberg consists of an area of about 6 km², with about 13000 residents (2005).

History 
Baumberg was first recorded in 1296 as "Boimberg", a village part of the Earldom of Berg. The tower of the Catholic Church St Dionysius was built in the 12th century. Until the 20th century Baumberg was a rural village, inhabited by mainly fishermen, (goat-)farmers and traditional craftsmen like basket-makers. At the end of the 19th century about 1000 people were living in Baumberg, at the end of World War II it were about 1,200 and 98 per cent of them were Catholics. In 1951 Baumberg became part of southern neighbouring Monheim. The federal social housing projects in the late 1960s boosted population from 5,000 residents in 1965 to 10,000 in 1969.

In the eastern part of Baumberg a new quarter with block of flats and terraced houses, the so-called Austrian quarter, was created from the late 1970s t the 1990s.

Today Baumberg is mainly a residential area with many commuters to Düsseldorf, Cologne and the Ruhr area.

Places of Interest
 Friedenskirche - The Friedenskirche (Peace Church) is a protestant church in Monheim-Baumberg, built from 1968 to 1974 according to the plans of Walter Maria Foerderer and an outstanding example of Brutalism in the Rhineland.

 Bürgerhaus - The citizens' meeting house was also built in the Eighties. It is used for events by associations and can be rented by the citizens for celebrations, too.

References

Towns in North Rhine-Westphalia